Charles Francis Feeney (born April 23, 1931) is an American businessman and philanthropist who made his fortune as a co-founder of the Hong Kong based Duty Free Shoppers Group. He is the founder of The Atlantic Philanthropies, one of the largest private charitable foundations in the world. Feeney gave away his fortune in secret for many years, until a business dispute resulted in his identity being revealed in 1997. Feeney has given away more than $8 billion.

Early life and education
Feeney was born in New Jersey during the Great Depression and came from a modest background of blue collar Irish-American parents in Elizabeth, New Jersey. His mother was a hospital nurse, and his father was an insurance underwriter. His ancestry can be traced to County Fermanagh in Northern Ireland. Feeney graduated from Elizabeth's St. Mary of the Assumption High School in 1949; he has credited his charitable spirit to his education at St. Mary. His 2016 donation of $250,000 was the largest in the school's history from a single contributor. He served as a U.S. Air Force radio operator during the Korean War, and began his career selling duty-free liquor to U.S. naval personnel at Mediterranean ports in the 1950s.

He graduated from the Cornell University School of Hotel Administration. He was a member of Alpha Sigma Phi, and an honorary member of the Sphinx Head Society.

Duty-Free Shoppers
The concept of "duty-free shopping"—offering high-end concessions to travelers, free of import taxes—was in its infancy when Feeney and his college classmate Robert Warren Miller started selling duty-free liquor to American servicemen in Asia in the 1950s. They later expanded to selling cars and tobacco, and founded the Duty Free Shoppers Group (DFS Group) on November 7, 1960. DFS began operations in Hong Kong, later expanding to Europe and other continents. DFS' first major breakthrough came in the early 1960s, when it secured the exclusive concession for duty-free sales in Hawaii, allowing it to market its products to Japanese travelers.

DFS eventually expanded to off-airport duty-free stores and large downtown Galleria stores and became the world's largest travel retailer. By the mid-1990s, DFS was distributing profits of up to $300 million a year to Feeney, Miller, and two smaller partners. "The rich returns came about in large part because DFS, like most other retailers in Asia, took a far higher markup on Western luxury items than was the case in Europe and the U.S. In New York, a retailer might price a designer handbag at 2.2 or 2.3 times the wholesale price. But in Asia, the retail price was a standard three times wholesale."

In 1996, Feeney and a partner sold their stakes in DFS to the French luxury conglomerate Louis Vuitton Moët Hennessy. Miller opposed the sale, and before a presumptive lawsuit could reveal that Feeney's stake was owned not in fact by him but by The Atlantic Philanthropies, Feeney outed himself in a New York Times article written by Judith Miller. Atlantic made $1.63 billion from the sale.

Philanthropy
In 1982, Feeney created The Atlantic Philanthropies, and in 1984, secretly transferred his entire 38.75% stake in DFS, then worth about $500 million, to the foundation. Not even his business partners knew that he no longer personally owned any part of DFS. For years, Atlantic gave away money in secret, requiring recipients to not reveal the sources of their donations. "Beyond Mr. Feeney's reticence about blowing his own horn, 'it was also a way to leverage more donations—some other individual might contribute to get the naming rights. The largest single beneficiary of Feeney's giving is his alma mater Cornell University, which has received nearly $1 billion in direct and Atlantic gifts, including a donation of $350 million enabling the creation of Cornell's New York City Tech Campus on Roosevelt Island. Through Atlantic, he has also donated around one billion dollars to education in Ireland, mostly to third-level institutions such as the University of Limerick and Dublin City University. Feeney has given substantial personal donations to Sinn Féin, a left-wing Irish nationalist party that is historically associated with the IRA. He has also supported the modernization of public-health structures in Vietnam.

In February 2011, Feeney became a signatory to The Giving Pledge. In his letter to Bill Gates and Warren Buffett, the founders of The Giving Pledge, Feeney writes, "I cannot think of a more personally rewarding and appropriate use of wealth than to give while one is living—to personally devote oneself to meaningful efforts to improve the human condition. More importantly, today's needs are so great and varied that intelligent philanthropic support and positive interventions can have greater value and impact today than if they are delayed when the needs are greater." He gave away his last $7 million in late 2016, to the same recipient of his first charitable donations: Cornell. Over the course of his life, he has given away more than $8 billion. At its height, Atlantic had over 300 employees and 10 offices across the globe.

In July 2017, The Atlantic Philanthropies noted the existence of an advance-fee scam email claiming to distribute money to "randomly selected individuals" worldwide, and using a link to the Wikipedia article to falsely verify the scammer's identity as "Charles Feeney".

On September 14, 2020, Feeney closed down the Atlantic Philanthropies after the nonprofit accomplished its mission of giving away all of Feeney's money by 2020.

Accolades
Feeney has been called the "James Bond of Philanthropy" by Forbes magazine for the stealthy and successful manner in which he anonymously donated approximately $8 billion to various charities. In 1997, Time said that "Feeney's beneficence already ranks among the grandest of any living American." He has shunned publicity, although he cooperated in his 2007 biography, The Billionaire Who Wasn't: How Chuck Feeney Made and Gave Away a Fortune Without Anyone Knowing. Feeney is also the subject of a documentary by RTÉ Factual, titled Secret Billionaire: The Chuck Feeney Story.

In 2010, he received the Cornell Icon of Industry Award. In 2012, all the universities of Ireland, North and South, jointly conferred an Honorary Doctorate of Laws on Feeney. During the year, he also received Ireland's "Presidential Distinguished Service Award" for Irish Abroad. In 2012, he also was awarded the UCSF Medal for outstanding personal contributions to the University of California, San Francisco's health science mission. In 2014, Warren Buffett said of Feeney, "[he's] my hero and Bill Gates' hero. He should be everybody's hero." On the 160th Anniversary of Queensland being created, June 6, 2019, Feeney was made an Honorary Queensland Great for his contribution to Queensland.

In December 2020, Cornell University announced that they would rename East Avenue, a road that goes through the center of campus and sits alongside his alma mater, Cornell University School of Hotel Administration, "Feeney Way," to honor Feeney for his contributions to the university.

Fordham University presented Feeney with an honorary doctorate of humane letters on March 8, 2022.

RMIT University presented Feeney with an honorary doctorate of Law on December 14, 2022.

Personal life
Feeney is known for his frugality. According to a New York Times article in 2017, "Until he was 75, he traveled only in coach, and carried reading materials in a plastic bag." He does not own a car or a house and wears a $10 Casio F-91W watch.

As of 2016, he lived in a rented apartment in San Francisco, with a remaining balance of $2 million.

First marriage
His first wife, Danielle, is French Algerian. At the time they first met, she was a student at Sorbonne. They were married in Paris in October 1959, first in a civil ceremony at the town hall, and the next day in church. They have four daughters: Caroleen A. Feeney, Diane V. Feeney, Juliette M. Feeney-Timsit, Leslie D. Feeney-Baily; and one son, Patrick A. Feeney. He divorced Danielle between 1990 and 1991.

Second marriage
His current wife, Helga, whom he married in 1995, is his former secretary.

References

External links

 "Secret Billionaire—The Chuck Feeney Story"biography published by Irish Independent.
 documentary originally broadcast by RTÉ Factual

1931 births
20th-century American businesspeople
American people of Irish descent
Philanthropists from New Jersey
Cornell University School of Hotel Administration alumni
Giving Pledgers
Honorary Companions of the Order of Australia
21st-century philanthropists
Living people
Businesspeople from Elizabeth, New Jersey
20th-century American philanthropists
American people of the Korean War
Former billionaires